Platelet-activating factor acetylhydrolase IB subunit alpha is an enzyme that in humans is encoded by the PAFAH1B1 gene. The protein is often referred to as Lis1 and plays an important role in regulating the motor protein Dynein.

Function 

PAFAH1B1 was identified as encoding a gene that when mutated or lost caused the lissencephaly associated with Miller–Dieker syndrome. PAFAH1B1 encodes the non-catalytic alpha subunit of the intracellular Ib isoform of platelet-activating factor acetylhydrolase, a heterotrimeric enzyme that specifically catalyzes the removal of the acetyl group at the SN-2 position of platelet-activating factor (identified as 1-O-alkyl-2-acetyl-sn-glyceryl-3-phosphorylcholine). Two other isoforms of intracellular platelet-activating factor acetylhydrolase exist: one composed of multiple subunits, the other, a single subunit. In addition, a single-subunit isoform of this enzyme is found in serum.

According to one study, PAFAH1B1 interacts with VLDLR receptor activated by reelin.

Genomics

The gene is located at chromosome 17p13.3 on the Watson (plus) strand. The gene is 91,953 bases in length and encodes a protein of 410 amino acids (predicted molecular weight 46.638 kiloDaltons).

Interactions 

PAFAH1B1 has been shown to interact with DYNC1H1, CLIP1, NDEL1, NDE1,  PAFAH1B3, PAFAH1B2, NUDC, TUBA1A and Doublecortin.

See also 
 platelet-activating factor
 PAFAH1B2
 PAFAH1B3

References

Further reading

External links 
 GeneReview/NIH/UW entry on LIS1-Associated Lissencephaly/Subcortical Band Heterotopia